Nagcarlan, officially the Municipality of Nagcarlan, is a 2nd class municipality in the province of Laguna, Philippines. According to the 2020 census, it has a population of 64,866 people.

The town is home to the Nagcarlan Underground Cemetery, one of the most important cemeteries in the Philippines which has been declared as a National Historical Landmark by virtue of Presidential Decree no. 260, dated August 1, 1973 with amendments by Administrative Order 1505, dated June 11, 1978. Since the declaration, no more burials were allowed in the cemetery. It underwent renovations before it was again opened to the public during the unveiling of the marker on November 24, 1981. The oldest tomb is dated 1887 while the last interment was in 1982 when it was formally declared as a National Historical Landmark.

Etymology
According to the origin, the name Nagcarlan came from the name of a famous rich and generous woman by Ana Kalang or Ana Panalangin was a native woman who was known for her golden salakot and cane which she always carried when walking around town. She was well-respected by the townfolk not just for her wealth but also for the help she extends to those in need. One day, a Spaniard came to her house and upon looking out of the window, he saw branches swaying and hitting one another, and so he asked what was going on. Ana Kalang answered and said "nagkakalang sila". The word was repeatedly mispronounced by the Spaniards until it became Nagcarlan, which is now the name of the town.

History 
Before the Spanish conquest of the area, it was headed by Gat Lakilaw. Christianity was propagated to the area in 1578 through Fr. Juan de Plasencia and Fr. Diego Oropesa, both missionaries of Franciscan Order. The area became a formal town in 1583 under Fr. Tomas de Miranda, who brought and successfully cultivated in Nagcarlan the first wheat seeds ever on our country's soil. The very first Gobernadorcillo was Gaspar Cahupa, a Nagcarleno who served until 1687. The first church was built in 1752 by Fr. Cristobal Torres. In 1851, Fr. Vicente Velloc, a Franciscan Missionary built the Underground Cemetery, the first of its kind in the Philippines. According to Historical records, this is where the historic Biac-Na-Bato pact was planned by Pedro Paterno and General Severino Taino in 1897. It was also in Nagcarlan, where the Brain of the Katipunan, General Emilio Jacinto, coming from Majayjay and wounded, was captured.

The Legend of the Hidden Tunnel of Nagcarlan
Nagcarlan was first colonized in 1571 by Juan de Salcedo, grandson of Miguel López de Legazpi. It was founded by Franciscan priests Juan de Plasencia and Diego Oropesa in 1578. The church of Nagcarlan was first built from light materials such as nipa and wood in 1583 under the chaplaincy of its first priest, Father Tomas de Miranda who also pioneered the cultivation of wheat in the country and was dedicated to Saint Bartholomew.Fr. Vicente Velloc supervised the establishment of a cemetery in Nagcarlan in 1845 below Mt. San Cristobal. Unlike the traditional Spanish cemeteries at that time, Fr. Velloc decided to build it away from the town's center. The cemetery is planned to serve as a public resting place for the people of the town while the underground chamber below the chapel of the cemetery will only house remains of Spanish friars and prominent people. It was built together with the construction of the expanded St. Bartholomew Parish Church and rectory. The cemetery is built with a chapel where funeral masses were held and directly below it is an underground crypt.
Pilgrims flock to the Nagcarlan Church to pray before the images of St. Bartholomew and San Diego de Alcala  known for their miraculous healing. However, there is also one interesting belief among the locals about a hidden tunnel which is referred to as "the Jewel of Nagcarlan"
the stories about the existence of a "hidden tunnel of the Nagcarlan Underground Cemetery" circulated and never ceased to depart from the minds of the believers.
This legend has been passed from generations after generations of Nagcarleños about the hidden tunnel somewhere in the very heart of Nagcarlan Underground Cemetery that is believed to be connected behind the church's Altar. Stories unendingly chronicled that the Franciscan Father Vicente Belloc who supposedly had the first hand knowledge of the secret tunnel, protectively carried the secret of the underground tunnel to his grave. To this date, many in Nagcarlan still believe and adhere to the "hearsays" that if one can locate "the Jewel of Nagcarlan", "the Hidden Tunnel of Nagcarlan Underground Cemetery that connects below the Altar of Nagcarlan Catholic Church, he might also be tracking his way up to the summit of the Legendary Mount Banahaw.

Geography

Barangays

Nagcarlan is subdivided into 52 barangays.

 Abo
 Alibungbungan
 Alumbrado
 Balayong
 Balimbing
 Balinacon
 Bambang
 Banago
 Banca-banca
 Bangcuro
 Banilad
 Bayaquitos
 Buboy
 Buenavista
 Buhanginan
 Bukal
 Bunga
 Cabuyew
 Calumpang
 Kanluran Kabubuhayan
 Silangan Kabubuhayan
 Labangan
 Lawaguin
 Kanluran Lazaan
 Silangan Lazaan
 Lagulo
 Maiit
 Malaya
 Malinao
 Manaol
 Maravilla
 Nagcalbang
 Poblacion I (Poblacion)
 Poblacion II (Poblacion)
 Poblacion III (Poblacion)
 Oples
 Palayan
 Palina
 Sabang
 San Francisco
 Sibulan
 Silangan Napapatid
 Silangan Ilaya
 Sinipian
 Santa Lucia
 Sulsuguin
 Talahib
 Talangan
 Taytay
 Tipacan
 Wakat
 Yukos

Climate

Distances 
Based on the great-circle distance (the shortest distance between two points over the surface of the Earth), the cities closest to Nagcarlan are San Pablo, Tayabas, Calamba, Tanauan, Lucena, and Lipa. The nearest municipalities are Liliw, Rizal, Majayjay, Magdalena, Calauan, and Luisiana. The following list delineates such distance measurements.

Nearest towns
 Liliw, Laguna,  to the East‑Southeast (S76°E)Rizal, Laguna,  to the Southwest (S40°W)Majayjay, Laguna,  to the East (N81°E) Magdalena, Laguna,  to the North‑Northeast (N14°E) Calauan, Laguna,  to the West (N83°W) Luisiana, Laguna,  to the East‑Northeast (N63°E)

Nearest cities
 San Pablo, Laguna,  to the Southwest (S52°W) Tayabas, Quezon,  to the East‑Southeast (S58°E) Calamba, Laguna,  to the West‑Northwest (N73°W) Tanauan, Batangas,  to the West‑Southwest (S79°W)Lucena,  to the Southeast (S44°E) Lipa, Batangas,  to the Southwest (S51°W)

From national capital
 Distance from Manila:  to the Northwest (N43°W)

Demographics

Economy

Election

2022

2019 
{| class="wikitable" style="text-align:center"
|-
! colspan="10"| 2019 Nagcarlan local election
|-
! rowspan="2" colspan="2"| Party
! rowspan="2"| Candidates
! colspan="5"| Running Mate
! rowspan="2"| Votes
! rowspan="2"| %
|-
! colspan="2"| Party
! Candidates
! Votes
! %
|-
| style="background:;" |
| Nacionalista
| Lourdes "Ody" Arcasetas
| style="background:;" |
| Nacionalista
| Felipe Arcigal III
| 12,041
| 38.53
| 17,781
| 54.78
|-
| style="background:;" |
| PDPLaban
| Amie Malabag-Hernandez
| style="background:;" |
| PDPLaban
| Rexon Arevalo
| 13,171
| 42.14
| 10,897
| 33.58
|-
! colspan="3"|
| style="background:;" |
| Independent
| Cecille Plantilla
| 3,946
| 12.63
! colspan="2"|
|-
| style="background:;" |
| LakasCMD
| Manolo Cura
| style="background:;" |
| LakasCMD
| Neri Monteza
| 2,094
| 6.70
| 3,777
| 11.64
|-
! colspan="6"| Total votes
| style="background:lightgray;" | 32,455
| style="background:lightgray;" | 100.00
| style="background:lightgray;" | 31,252
| style="background:lightgray;" | 100.00
|-
| style="background:lightgray;" colspan="10" align="left"| 'Winner : Nacionalista, PDPLaban
|}

Transportation
Tricycles and jeepneys are popular modes of transportation in Nagcarlan.

Tourism

Nagcarlan has clean flowing rivers, gushing water falls, calm lakes and lush hills and mountains, historic Spanish colonial sites, restaurants with competitive and affordable dishes, resorts and vacation houses.

Along Rizal Avenue, leading from the market to the municipio still stands many old Art Deco buildings built during the 1920s to the 1930s. The presence of many narrow three-story buildings where the ground floors are rented out to commercial establishments in Nagcarlan is an indication that the town may have played the role of the central trading center early in the previous century.

There are also many natural attractions within Nagcarlan. The little known Bunga Falls is a favorite getaway among the locals, while the hidden Yambo Lake can be accessed through the back roads going to Calauan. The "baby" mountains can be climbed in a day, the assistance of a local guide is usually required, as the trails are usually covered with vegetation.
Another interesting attraction is the San Bartolome Apostol Church. Located on an elevated ground overlooking the rest of the town, the 18th century church built by the Franciscans has an elegant stone and red clay façade with an imposing bell-tower on the right and an attractive convento on the left. The parish officials still allow visitors to climb up to the top of the bell tower to see where Anne Curtis shot most of her scenes in the famous TV series Kampanerang Kuba.

Nagcarlan's best known attraction is Nagcarlan Underground Cemetery. This one of its kind cemetery in the Philippines, where there are 240 niches laying above ground and 36 niches underground. Members of the town's elite were buried underground below the funeral chapel. It is said that the underground cemetery was used by the Katipuneros to hold their secret meetings.

Notable personalities
Esteban Baldivia -  (September 2, 1928 – October 10, 1997), better known as Dencio Padilla or Tata Dens, was a veteran Filipino actor and comedian.
Jak Roberto - Jan Rommel "Jak" Osuna Roberto (born December 2, 1993) is a Filipino actor, model and singer. He was a member of the trio boy band 3LOGY alongside Jeric Gonzales and Abel Estanislao. Roberto is currently working as an exclusive artist of GMA Network, and is known for his role as Andres "Andoy" dela Cruz in the 2017 television series Meant To Be'' . Roberto is brother to fellow GMA artist Sanya Lopez.

References

External links

 [ Philippine Standard Geographic Code]
 Philippine Census Information
 Local Governance Performance Management System

Municipalities of Laguna (province)